Saconnex d'Arve is a hamlet in Plan-les-Ouates, Geneva canton, Switzerland. It is divided in two, Saconnex d'Arve Dessous and Saconnex d'Arve Dessus.

Educational facilities 
The hamlet shared a small school until it was closed in 2015 and converted into a communal room available to rent to the public for private or public events. Students from the hamlet now attend school in the nearby hamlet of Plan-les-Ouates.

Transportation 
The southern part of the hamlet is served by the 43 and 46 lines of the Geneva public transit company. The northern part is only served by the 46 line. The hamlet also has several roads with bike paths or lanes.

References

Villages in Switzerland
Canton of Geneva